Jerry Lawrence may refer to:

 Jerry Lawrence (politician) (born 1937), Canadian broadcaster and politician
 Jerry Lawrence (footballer) (born 2005), English footballer
 Jerry Lawrence Provincial Park, Canadian provincial park in Upper Tanatallon, Nova Scotia named after politician